Saint-Frédéric is a parish in the Municipalité régionale de comté Beauce-Centre in Quebec, Canada. It is part of the Chaudière-Appalaches region and the population is 1,065 as of 2021. It is named after Reverend Frédéric Caron, first priest of Saint-Frédéric.

Demographics 

Population trend:
 Population in 2021: 1,065 (2006 to 2011 population change: 6.8%)
 Population in 2016: 1,044
 Population in 2011: 1,085
 Population in 2006: 1,049
 Population in 2001: 1,087
 Population in 1996: 1,006
 Population in 1991: 1,008
 Population in 1986: 1,044
 Population in 1981: 1,023
 Population in 1976: 900
 Population in 1971: 940
 Population in 1966: 938
 Population in 1961: 1,056
 Population in 1956: 1,003
 Population in 1951: 1,032
 Population in 1941: 1,306
 Population in 1931: 1,113
 Population in 1921: 1,189
 Population in 1911: 1,710
 Population in 1901: 1,814
 Population in 1891: 1,814
 Population in 1881: 1,801
 Population in 1871: 1,765
 Population in 1861: 1,051

Notable people 
 Louis-Albert Vachon, archbishop of Quebec

References

Commission de toponymie du Québec
Ministère des Affaires municipales, des Régions et de l'Occupation du territoire

Parish municipalities in Quebec
Incorporated places in Chaudière-Appalaches